László Ede Hudec or Ladislav Hudec (Besztercebánya, Austria-Hungary (now Banská Bystrica, Slovakia) January 8, 1893 – Berkeley, October 26, 1958), Chinese name Wu Dake, was a Hungarian–Slovak architect active in Shanghai from 1918 to 1945 and responsible for some of that city's most notable structures. Major works include the Park Hotel, the Grand Theatre, the Joint Savings and Loan building, the combined Baptist Publications and Christian Literature Society buildings, and the post-modern "Green House". Hudec's style evolved during his active period, from the eclectic neo-classicism popular in the early 20th century to art deco and modern buildings toward the later part of his career. Although some of his buildings have been lost in the intervening decades, many survive.

Biography

Hudec was born in 1893 in Besztercebánya, Austria-Hungary (now Banská Bystrica in Slovakia). His father, György Hugyecz was a wealthy Magyarized Slovak architect, born in the nearby village of Felsőmicsinye (now Horná Mičiná), while his mother, Paula Skultéty was an ethnic Hungarian from Kassa (now Košice). He studied architecture at Budapest University from 1911 to 1914. As a patriot, Hudec volunteered to join the Austro-Hungarian Army after outbreak of World War I, but was captured by the Russian Army in 1916 and was sent to a prison camp in Siberia. While being transferred, he jumped from a train near the Chinese border and made his way to Shanghai, where he joined the American architectural office R. A. Curry.

In 1925, he opened his own practice, and was responsible for at least 37 buildings up to 1941.

After the Munich Agreement, (1938) Hudec lost his Czechoslovak citizenship and applied to become Hungarian citizen. In 1941 he obtained a Hungarian passport and was appointed Honorary Consul of Hungary in Shanghai.

Hudec's masterpiece is usually considered to be the 22-story Park Hotel Shanghai, on Nanjing Road across from People's Square. Built in 1934, it was the tallest building in the city until the 1980s, and is still a local landmark.

After leaving Shanghai in 1947, Hudec moved to Lugano and later to Rome. In 1950 he moved to Berkeley where he taught at the University of California. He died from a heart-attack during an earthquake in 1958. In 1970 his remains were buried in an evangelical cemetery in Banská Bystrica.

Buildings in Shanghai

 American Club, Shanghai
Country Hospital
 Paulun Hospital
 Margaret Williamson Hospital (Red House Hospital)
 Moore Memorial Church
 German Church
 Chapei Power Station （）
 China Baptist Publication Society and Christian Literature Society Building （）
 Union Brewery
 Grand Theatre
 Park Hotel Shanghai
 Dr Woo's villa (Green house)
 Avenue Apartments
 Wukang Mansion (Normandie Apartments)
 Hudec House
 Columbia Circle
 Columbia Country Club

Buildings in Slovakia 

 SPA chapel of the Queen of Heaven in Vyhne

References

Notes

External links
 Hudec Heritage Project
 Exhibit Highlights Shanghai Hotel and its Designer
 Laszlo Hudec fonds at University of Victoria, Special Collections
 Interactive 3D models of László Hudec's buildings created with Virtual Building Explorer.
 Official site of the year of Hudec in Shanghai

1893 births
1958 deaths
Austro-Hungarian architects
People from Banská Bystrica
Hungarian architects
Slovak architects
Austro-Hungarian military personnel of World War I
Hungarian emigrants to the United States
University of California, Berkeley College of Letters and Science faculty
Hungarian expatriates in China
Hungarian people of Slovak descent